White Boy Posse (WBP), a.k.a. Whiteboy Posse, are a Canadian white supremacist neo-Nazi organized crime group founded in 2003 in Edmonton, Alberta, Canada, the organization is primarily active in Western Canada.

Formation and history
The White Boy Posse was founded in the year 2003 by Sean "Fat Mike" Jackson, a close associate of the Hells Angels Motorcycle Club.

Members are known to come from impoverished backgrounds, experiencing violence and abuse on a regular basis. Racist attitudes tend to initially be learned at home and later manipulated by gang leaders.

The gang first received media attention in Edmonton in 2004 after five White Boy Posse members were kidnapped and assaulted by rival gang the Crazy Dragon Killers.

Since its initial formation, the gang has since spread and currently operating in Alberta, Saskatchewan and the Northwest Territories.

Structure and organization
The White Boy Posse is a criminal enterprise that conducts cross-border business with a broad spectrum of other gangs and organized crime groups. The group is primarily active in Northern Alberta, but had reach as far as Yellowknife. Groups like the White Boy Posse are employed by larger criminal organizations to carry out crimes that would risk drawing police attention.

Fully initiated members, referred to as "fully-patched", sport tattoos of the gang. WPB members also tend to exhibit tattoos of typical Nazi symbolism clichés including swastikas, the reichsadler, and other related national socialist motifs reminiscent of the Third Reich. However, they appear to have no links to any of the country's white power skinhead gangs, despite their neo-Nazi ideologies. Nevertheless, the WBP is widely considered by law enforcement to be bent on white supremacism.

Notable crimes

Death of Martin William Kent
In 2007, White Boy Posse member Martin William Kent was run over and killed while trying to prevent fellow member William Roy King from stealing his car.

Killing of Mitchell Chambers
In December 2008, 23-year-old Mitchell Chambers was shot and killed in his pickup truck while waiting to take a woman to a movie. The shooter would later be identified as Joshua Petrin, a high-ranking member of the White Boy Posse. Investigators allege that Chambers had been shot over the romantic relationship he had with the woman, a former girlfriend of Petrin's.

Lorry Santos homicide
In September 2012, Lorry Ann Santos, a mother of four, was gunned down immediately after answering a knock on the door to her home. Her killing had apparently been intended for T.J. Cromartie, a former member of the White Boy Posse who left the gang in 2012. Instead, an incorrect memory led the shooter to the wrong address, where Santos resided.

Lorry Santos' killer would later be identified as Randy O’Hagan.

Bob Roth decapitation
In October 2012, the headless corpse of Robert John "Bob" Roth Sr. was discovered by Edmonton police located inside a garbage bag in a back alley near 132nd Avenue and 72nd Street in the Balwin neighbourhood.

Roth was murdered by Randy James Wayne O'Hagan and Nikolas Jon Nowytzkyj, two White Boy Posse members.

Shooting of Bryan Gower
Sometime prior to or during 2012, alleged drug dealer Bryan Gower had apparently been stealing drugs and money from other associates of the White Boy Posse. In response, high-ranking WBP member Joshua Petrin ordered that he was to be killed. Two White Boy Posse hitmen were then sent to meet with Gower where he would be lured to his death. Once Gower had shown up to what was supposed to be a drug exchange at a rural intersection north of Lloydminster, he was immediately gunned down.

The shooter, Kyle Darren Halbauer, was eventually arrested later in December of the same year.

Law enforcement action

Operation Goliath
Starting in late 2006, members of the Edmonton Police Service and the Organized Crime Unit of the Royal Canadian Mounted Police conducted an undercover 15-month operation that targeted the White Boy Posse.

Dubbed Project Goliath, this law enforcement sting resulted in the arrest of 14 members of the White Boy Posse. 28 firearms, $500,000 in cocaine, over $300,000 in cash, 3,000 ecstasy pills, and several stolen items were also seized by the RCMP.

Project Goliath consisted of RCMP officers from Leduc, Lloydminster, Fort McMurray, Yellowknife and Whitecourt in the investigation, implying that the White Boy Posse had been active in said areas.

ALERT
Following the three killings that occurred in 2012, an 8-week investigation by Alberta Law Enforcement Response Teams (ALERT) was initiated. It led to the arrest of three White Boy Posse Members, one of which was Joshua Petrin.

See also
Other Canadian white supremacist neo-Nazi organizations:
Aryan Guard
Heritage Front (defunct)
Nationalist Party of Canada
Tri-City Skins (defunct)
Canadian Nazi Party (defunct)

Other organized crime groups in Canada:
Manitoba Warriors
Dixon Bloods
Indian Posse

References 

Organizations established in 2003
2003 establishments in Alberta
Neo-Nazism in Canada
Neo-Nazi organizations
Street gangs
Gangs in Alberta